Willie Mae Reid (born April 20, 1928) is an American politician who ran as the Socialist Workers Party candidate for Mayor of Chicago in 1975, winning 16,693 votes but coming in third place against Richard J. Daley.  The number had fallen from the number of signatures she'd acquired to get on the ballot, 66,000.  She also ran as their vice presidential candidate in 1976 (Presidential candidate: Peter Camejo) and 1992 (Presidential candidate: James "Mac" Warren), winning 91,314 votes.

Bibliography
 The racist offensive against busing: the lessons of Boston, how to fight back (1974)
 Last hired, first fired. Affirmative action vs seniority NY: Pathfinder Press. 1975.
 Black Women's Struggle for Equality  NY: Pathfinder Press. (1976) (co-author)
 Which way for the women's movement? How to win against the attacks on women's rights  NY: Pathfinder Press. (1977) (co-author)

References

1928 births
Living people
African-American candidates for Vice President of the United States
American Trotskyists
American women writers
Politicians from Chicago
1976 United States vice-presidential candidates
1992 United States vice-presidential candidates
20th-century American politicians
Socialist Workers Party (United States) vice presidential nominees
Female candidates for Vice President of the United States
Communist women writers
Socialist Workers Party (United States) politicians from Illinois